The Atari Cosmos was an unreleased product by Atari, Inc. for the handheld/tabletop electronic game system market that uses holography to improve the display. It is similar to other small electronic games of the era that used a simple LED-based display, but superimposes a two-layer holographic image over the LEDs for effect. Two small lights illuminate one or both of the holographic images depending on the game state. The system was never released, and is now a coveted collectors item.

History
The Cosmos was created by Atari Inc. engineers Allan Alcorn, Harry Jenkins and Roger Hector. Work on the Cosmos began in 1978. Atari Inc. purchased most of the rights to holographic items so that they could make this system. The Cosmos was to have nine released games, but all of the game logic for those games was included in the Cosmos itself – the cartridges only contained the holographic images and a notch to identify what game it was. This technically made the Cosmos a dedicated console, but Atari Inc. didn't publicize this fact.

In advertisements made for the system before the Cosmos' cancellation, Atari Inc. claimed that the holographic images were life like and 3D. While this may have been true, the images didn't influence the actual gameplay at all. There were only two images to a game, though they did enhance each game's appearance. The system was intended to be powered by AC adaptor rather than batteries. The Cosmos would have supported up to 2 players.

In 1981, the Cosmos was exhibited at the 1981 New York Toy Fair. Reviewers were extremely critical of the system, but Atari Inc. stood by it and managed to obtain 8,000 pre-orders at the show alone. Engineering logs indicate that a 250 unit run was to be made, but it's unclear if they were all produced. In interviews by Curt Vendel with Al Alcorn and Steve Providence, management removed all of the parts and components from the "Holoptics Lab"; they are speculated to have been destroyed. Shortly thereafter, Ray Kassar directed Al Alcorn to close down the Holoptics labs and remove all of the holographic photography equipment and associated machinery.

Many advertisements were made, and the system's boxes were manufactured. Everything seemed ready to go, but Atari Inc. pulled the plug by the end of 1981. It was speculated that Atari Inc. felt the Cosmos was too much of a risk in the face of the criticism it had received.

Games
Asteroids
Basketball
Dodge 'Em
Football
Outlaw
Road Runner
Sea Battle
Space Invaders
Superman

Specifications

CPU - COPS444L
Graphic Modes - Holographic backgrounds and programmable LEDs
Lighting:  2 Dual non reflective incandescent lights for "A" and "B" Holoptic scenes
Power Supply:  10.5VAC 750MA

References

External links

 Atari Cosmos Podcast at the Retroist

Cosmos
Dedicated consoles
Cancelled projects
Holography
Vaporware game consoles